The 2002–03 season was Colchester United's 61st season in their history and their fifth successive season in the third tier of English football, the Second Division. Alongside competing in the Second Division, the club also participated in the FA Cup, the League Cup and the Football League Trophy.

After a first round FA Cup exit to Conference side Chester City and a seven-game winless run, manager Steve Whitton left the club by mutual consent, with Phil Parkinson appointed in his first ever managerial role. He led the club from the relegation zone to a 12th-place finish, their highest position for 23 years.

Season overview
Following consecutive seasons of gradual improvement under Steve Whitton, the club found themselves in the relegation zone following a run of seven games without a win and a first round FA Cup exit to non-League Chester City. He left the club by mutual consent in January as former player Geraint Williams stepped up as caretaker manager while putting his name forward for the permanent role. However, with his many contacts at FA board level, chairman Peter Heard made a surprise appointment of Reading's player-coach Phil Parkinson.

Parkinson helped turn around the club's fortunes, lifting them from the relegation zone to 12th place, their best finish for 23 years.

In the League Cup, Colchester were eliminated by Coventry City in the first round, while Cheltenham Town defeated the U's in the first round of the Football League Trophy.

Away from the pitch, following the collapse of ITV Digital which had promised clubs greater television rights finances, a number of clubs found themselves entering administration or suffering lasting financial difficulty as a result of spending the money on players and resources before any had been received. Prudently, Peter Heard had never budgeted more than the club could afford and as such Colchester United were largely unaffected by the collapse.

Players

Transfers

In

 Total spending:  ~ £0

Out

 Total incoming:  ~ £0

Loans in

Loans out

Match details

Second Division

League table

Results round by round

Matches

Football League Cup

Football League Trophy

FA Cup

Squad statistics

Appearances and goals

|-
!colspan="16"|Players who appeared for Colchester who left during the season

|}

Goalscorers

Disciplinary record

Clean sheets
Number of games goalkeepers kept a clean sheet.

Player debuts
Players making their first-team Colchester United debut in a fully competitive match.

See also
List of Colchester United F.C. seasons

References

General
Books

Websites

Specific

2002-03
English football clubs 2002–03 season
2002–03 Football League Second Division by team